Cabanès may refer to the following communes in France:

 Cabanès, Aveyron in the Aveyron department, Midi-Pyrénées region
 Cabanès, Tarn in the Tarn department, Midi-Pyrénées region

See also
 Cabanes (disambiguation)
 Cabannes (disambiguation)
 Cabana (disambiguation)